may refer to , a title of a retired Emperor of Japan. Joko may also refer to:

Name

Indonesia 
Joko is a masculine name for Indonesian people, especially Javanese people.

Outside Indonesia 
 Joko Beck
 Jōkō Ninomiya
 Joko Obama
 Joko Winterscheidt
 Joko Diaz

Place 
 , a railway station in Japan